Milbourne King Block, Sr. -- known as King Block (April 11, 1929 – October 6, 2014)—was an American college football player and coach. He was the head coach at Arkansas State College (now ASU) from 1960 to 1962 and amassed a 13–14 record.

Early years
Born in Superior, Nebraska, Block earned 12 athletic letters at Twin Falls High School in south central Idaho, and graduated in 1947. He played college football at the University of Idaho in Moscow, where he was a fullback under head coach Dixie Howell. Block played on the varsity from 1948 to 1950, and was named to the All-Coast football team. He was selected in the 21st round of the 1951 NFL Draft by the Detroit Lions. At Idaho, he was a member of Sigma Alpha Epsilon fraternity, and graduated with a degree in education.

Coaching career
After a coaching stint at Grangeville High School in north central Idaho, Block joined the Arkansas State coaching staff as the backfield assistant in 1955, under head coach Gene Harlow, who had been the guards coach at Idaho while Block was in college. Block was promoted to head coach in February 1960 and compiled a 13–14 record in three seasons. His offense was described as primarily reliant upon "the running of the fullback and quarterback."

He resigned after the 1962 season to become the defensive line coach at Nebraska under head coach Bob Devaney. Arkansas State replaced Block with defensive backs coach Bennie Ellender. After one season in Lincoln, Block joined the staff of new head coach Bert Clark at Washington State in 1964 and remained in Pullman through 1967. He later served as an assistant at Iowa State until 1972. Aside from coaching football, Block also competed in rodeo events and bred quarterhorses, which he later parlayed into "King Blocks Korral," one of the largest western stores in Iowa.

Death
After a lengthy illness, Block died in 2014 at age 85 in Ozark, Missouri; his remains were cremated.

Head coaching record

References

External links
Gem of the Mountains - 1950 - University of Idaho yearbook - 1949 football season - King Block - p. 217

1929 births
2014 deaths
American football fullbacks
Arkansas State Red Wolves football coaches
Idaho Vandals football players
Iowa State Cyclones football coaches
Nebraska Cornhuskers football coaches
Washington State Cougars football coaches
People from Twin Falls, Idaho
People from Superior, Nebraska
High school football coaches in Idaho
Players of American football from Idaho
Players of American football from Nebraska
Non-traditional rodeo performers